Copa Peregrino was a friendly football tournament between clubs of Rio de Janeiro and Norway in 2008. Hosted in Rio de Janeiro, the competition was played in stadiums such as Estádio Giulite Coutinho, in Mesquita, but, one match was played in Estádio Olímpico João Havelange. Botafogo was the champion even playing one match less than the others teams.

Groups

Brazilians

Norwegians

Final standings

Champion

Scorers
Paulsen, Start, 2 goals;
Khalili, Start, 2 goals;
Alessandro, Botafogo, 1 goal;
Édson, Botafogo, 1 goal;
Fábio, Botafogo, 1 goal;
Jorge Henrique, Botafogo, 1 goal;
Lúcio Flávio, Botafogo, 1 goal
Zé Carlos, Botafogo, 1 goal;
Hulsker, Start, 1 goal;
Amaral, Madureira, 1 goal;
Felipe Alves, Madureira, 1 goal;
Paulo Roberto, Madureira, 1 goal;
Mílson Santos, Madureira, 1 goal;
Aron, América, 1 goal;
Assad, América, 1 goal;
Élvis, América, 1 goal;
Marco Brito, América, 1 goal;
Austnes, Viking, 1 goal;
Fillo, Viking, 1 goal;
Adelson, Viking, 1 goal;
Espen, Stabæk, 1 goal;
Bruno, Boavista, 1 goal;
Flávio Santos, Boavista, 1 goal;
Segerstron (own goal), Stabæk, 1 goal;
Máximo (own goal), América, 1 goal;
Cléberson (own goal), América, 1 goal.

2008 in Brazilian football
Brazilian football friendly trophies